Dallas Lore Sharp (1870–1929) was an American author and university professor, born in the Haleyville section of Commercial Township, in Cumberland County, New Jersey.

He graduated at Brown University in 1895, served as a Methodist Episcopal minister for four years,  and graduated at the Boston University School of Theology in 1899.  He married Grace Hastings and the couple had four sons, including Waitstill Sharp.

He was assistant librarian (1899–1902), assistant professor of English (1902–09), and thereafter professor at Boston University.

As a writer he became known through his charming magazine articles on native birds and small mammals and for his books which featured illustrations by American wildlife illustrator Robert Bruce Horsfall as well as artist Elizabeth Myers Snagg.

Works

 Wildlife Near Home (1901)  
 A Watcher in the Woods (1903)  
 Roof and Meadow (1904)
 The Lay of the Land (1908) illustrated by Elizabeth Myers Snagg 
 Ways of the Woods (1908)  
 In American Fields and Forests (1908) (with Henry David Thoreau, John Burroughs, Bradford Torrey, Dallas Lore Sharp, Olive Thorne Miller, and John Muir)  
 The Spring of the Year (1909)  
 The Fall of the Year (1911)  
 The Face of the Fields (1911)  
 Winter (1912)  
 Summer (1913)  
 The Year Out of Doors (1914)  
 Beyond the Pasture Bars (1914)
 Where Rolls the Oregon (1914) (revised and reprinted as Eastern Naturalist in the West: Dallas Lore Sharp 1912 by Sand Lake Press)  
 The Whole Year Round (1915) 
 The Hills of Hingham (1916)
 Patrons of Democracy (1920)
 The Seer of Slabsides (1921)
 A January Summer (1922)
 Highlands and Hollows (1923)
 The Magical Chance (1923)
 The Spirit of the Hive (1925)
 Sanctuary! Sanctuary! (1926)
 The Better Country (1928)
 Romances frrm the Old Testament (1932)
 Christ and His Time (1933)

References

External links
 
 
 
 
 

Brown University alumni
Boston University faculty
1870 births
1929 deaths
People from Commercial Township, New Jersey
19th-century American Episcopalians
Boston University School of Theology alumni
American nature writers
American male non-fiction writers
20th-century American Episcopalians
20th-century American academics
20th-century American male writers
20th-century American non-fiction writers